The 2017 American Athletic Conference men's soccer tournament was the 5th edition of the American Athletic Conference Men's Soccer Tournament. The tournament decides the American Athletic Conference champion and guaranteed representative into the 2017 NCAA Division I Men's Soccer Championship.  The tournament was played at Westcott Field on the campus of SMU in Dallas on November 10 and 12.

Seeding and format
The teams are seeded based on their performance in the conference's round-robin regular season.  The top four teams qualify for the event.

Bracket

Results

Semifinals

Championship

Broadcasting
The semifinals were streamed live on the American Digital Network. The final was carried live on ESPNU.

Statistics

Goals

Assists

Shutouts

Awards

Most valuable players 

 Emil Cuello (Offensive) (SMU)
 Jordan Cano (Defensive) (SMU)

All-Tournament team 
The following 11 players were named to the American Athletic Conference's All-Tournament team. A record six players from SMU were selected for the team.

See also 
 2017 American Athletic Conference Women's Soccer Tournament

References

2017 American Athletic Conference men's soccer season
American Athletic Conference Men's Soccer Tournament
American soccer tournament